Acree is an unincorporated community in Worth County, in the U.S. state of Georgia.

History
A post office called Acree was established in 1881, and remained in operation until 1955. A variant name was "Davis".

References

Unincorporated communities in Dougherty County, Georgia
Unincorporated communities in Georgia (U.S. state)